Gurara may refer to:
 Gurara, Nigeria, a local government area in Nigeria
 Gurara (Algeria), or Gourara, a region of Algeria north of the Tuat
 Gurara language, a Berber language of Algeria

See also 
 Gurara Waterfalls, in Nigeria
 Basa-Gurara, a language of Nigeria